The Pentecostal Churches of Christ is a Protestant Christian denomination in the Oneness Pentecostal and Holiness-Pentecostal traditions. The Pentecostal Churches of Christ self-identify as "Anglican-Apostolic". The Pentecostal Churches of Christ was founded and initially led by Bishop J. Delano Ellis, and is headquartered in Cleveland, Ohio, United States while the seat of its primate is currently Memphis, Tennessee.

History 
Following a meeting on May 29, 1992 convened at Cleveland, Ohio by Bishop Ellis, several congregations affiliated together as the United Pentecostal Churches of Christ. The then newly formed United Pentecostal Churches of Christ recognized Bishop Ellis as their general overseer and president on August 22, 1992. Bishop Ellis continued in this role with United Pentecostal Churches of Christ for twelve years until he resigned in June 2004.

As of 2014, at least two distinct Pentecostal Christian denominations look to the May 29, 1992 meeting convened by Bishop J. Delano Ellis as their starting-point or as a particular landmark on their journey, and that regard the first twelve or more years of the United Pentecostal Churches of Christ as part of their history; these two are the Pentecostal Churches of Christ and United Covenant Churches of Christ; the Pentecostal Churches of Christ also regards 1935 as its year of organization through the Pentecostal Church of Christ in Cleveland. When Bishop Garnes was installed as presiding bishop of United Covenant Churches of Christ (October 30, 2009), Bishop Ellis was chief installer at the ceremony of installation.

In 2020, after the death of Bishop J. Delano Ellis, Bishop Darryl D. Woodson was elected as second presiding bishop for the Pentecostal Churches of Christ.

See also 

 J. Delano Ellis
 United Pentecostal Churches of Christ
 United Covenant Churches of Christ

References

External links

 Website of the Pentecostal Churches of Christ

Charismatic and Pentecostal organizations
Pentecostal denominations
Christian organizations based in the United States
Holiness denominations
Oneness Pentecostal denominations
Historically African-American Christian denominations